Ciao Baby may refer to:

Ciao, Baby, a 2007 album by The Start
"Ciao Baby", a song written by Larry Weiss and Scott English
Ciao, Baby!, a play by Kent R. Brown

See also
"Edie (Ciao Baby)", a 1989 song by	The Cult